The Death Valley Railroad (DVRR) was a  narrow gauge railroad that operated in California's Death Valley to carry borax with the route running from Ryan, California and the mines at Lila C, both located just east of Death Valley National Park, to Death Valley Junction, a distance of approximately .

History
When mining operations at the Lila C. Mine were declining around 1914, Pacific Coast Borax Company began scouting the land outside Furnace Creek for richer borax deposits. Once they found some a bit west of the present mines, plans were put forward to build a narrow gauge railroad from the new mines to connect with the Tonopah & Tidewater Railroad at Death Valley Junction to ship the borax away for processing and packaging.

The line was built by a separate company from Pacific Coast Borax Company, because they were struggling with financial issues at the time. Equipment and Heisler locomotive #2 "Francis" from the Pacific Coast Borax Company's old Borate and Daggett Railroad were used to build the Death Valley Railroad. After the line was completed, two  steam locomotives were bought from the Baldwin Locomotive Works to work the line and Francis was sold off.

One train ran per day bringing food and water to the workers at the Ryan mine, and bought ore back late in the afternoon. After better deposits of borax were discovered at Boron, the Death Valley Railroad tried to resort to tourist operations by bringing in a Brill railcar to transport tourists to the old mines. Due to a lack of profit from tourists and freight trains and the closure of the mines, the railroad closed in 1931.

Much of the railroad ran parallel to what is today State Route 190. After this railroad ceased operations,  the United States Potash Company bought the equipment, track and rolling stock to construct their own line located near Loving, New Mexico, which became the United States Potash Railroad. All the rails from the Death Valley Railroad were used on the new line until about 1941 when they were replaced by heavier-pound rails from the Atchison, Topeka & Santa Fe Railroad. The line was used until 1967 when better potash deposits were discovered in Saskatchewan and Pacific Coast Borax Company merged with U.S. Potash and became U.S. Borax & Chemical Cooperation.

Preservation

After the United States Potash Railroad turned over their operations to diesel locomotives in the 1950s, the two ex-Death Valley Railroad engines were both singled out for preservation.

No. 1 was sent to Carlsbad, New Mexico and put on display in between Park Drive and E. Riverside Drive and sports the bold lettering of "U.S. Potash" on the sides of her tender.

No. 2 also worked for the United States Potash Railroad, but she was bought by the Death Valley National Park and is now currently at the Borax Museum at Furnace Creek.

A railcar was bought in the later years of the line in 1928, when Pacific Coast Borax attempted to save their dying railroads, DVRR included, from the scrapheap by promoting them as tourist attractions. She too, was bought by the United States Potash Railroad to transport workers to the potash mines. By 1967, she was worn out, but the Laws Rail Museum of Bishop, California managed to step in just in time to save her from scrap. After several years of extensive restoration, she now runs happily on the museum's  narrow gauge track.

The bogey trucks of some of the old DVRR ore cars are said to still exist at Laws, whilst the old caboose (#100) still exists on the property of the old potash refinery site at Loving, New Mexico. The tankcar bodies (also ex-DVRR) are also located just outside Carlsbad.

The old Heisler locomotive "Francis" formerly from the Borate and Daggett Railroad, saw some years of service on the DVRR after construction was completed, that is until the arrival of Baldwin #2 in 1916. At that time the Heisler was sold off to the Nevada Short Line Railway, and ultimately saw use in the timber fields working for the Terry Lumber Company (later Red River Lumber). It was scrapped around 1925 after the closure of the Terry lumber mill following a devastating fire.

References

External links

Tonopah & Tidewater RR Database --- Death Valley Railroad and its environs, webpage and images
U.S. Potash Railroad excerpt of book by Gordon Chappell, explaining the lives of the Death Valley Railroad engines on the United States Potash Railroad

 Jeff Terry: Death Valley No. 5 and the Laws Railroad Museum

Defunct California railroads
Mining railways in the United States
Amargosa Desert
Death Valley
History of the Mojave Desert region
History of Inyo County, California
Mining in California
Transportation in Inyo County, California
3 ft gauge railways in the United States
Narrow gauge railroads in California
Tonopah and Tidewater Railroad
Borates
Closed railway lines in the United States